Diego Perren (born 10 January 1965) is a Swiss curler and Olympic champion. He received a gold medal at the 1998 Winter Olympics in Nagano.

References

External links
 

1965 births
Living people
Swiss male curlers
Olympic curlers of Switzerland
Curlers at the 1998 Winter Olympics
Olympic gold medalists for Switzerland
Olympic medalists in curling
Medalists at the 1998 Winter Olympics
Swiss curling champions
20th-century Swiss people